The 2015–16 Pac-12 Conference men's basketball season began with practices in October 2015 and ended with the 2016 Pac-12 Conference men's basketball tournament in March 2016 at the MGM Grand Garden Arena in Paradise, Nevada. The regular season began on the first weekend of November 2015, with the conference schedule starting in December 2015.

This was the fifth season under the Pac-12 Conference name and the 57th since the conference was established under its current charter as the Athletic Association of Western Universities in 1959. Including the history of the Pacific Coast Conference, which operated from 1915 to 1959 and is considered by the Pac-12 as a part of its own history, this was the Pac-12's 101st season of men's basketball.

Preseason
 October 15, 2015 – Pac-12 Men's Basketball Media Day, Pac-12 Networks Studios, San Francisco

() first place votes

Recruiting classes

Rankings
The Pac-12 had 4 teams ranked and 3 others receiving votes in the preseason Coaches' Poll. It had four teams ranked in the preseason AP Poll and one other receiving votes.

Pac-12 regular season

Conference Schedule
This table summarizes the head-to-head results between teams in conference play.

Head coaches

Note: Stats shown are before the beginning of the season. Overall and Pac-12 records are from time at current school.

Postseason

Pac-12 tournament

The conference tournament is scheduled for Wednesday–Saturday March, 9-12, 2016 at the MGM Grand Garden Arena located in Paradise, Nevada. The top four teams had a bye on the first day, March 9, 2016. Teams were seeded by conference record, with ties broken by record between the tied teams followed by record against the regular-season champion, if necessary.

* denotes each overtime period played

NCAA tournament

National Invitation tournament

Awards and honors

Pac-12 Tournament MVP

All-Pac-12 Tournament Teams
First Team
Second Team

Player of the Week
Source

All-Americans

AP
First Team
Second Team
Jakob Pöltl (Utah)

USBWA
First Team
Second Team
Jakob Pöltl (Utah)

District VIII: Player of the Year
Jakob Pöltl (Utah)
District VIII: Coach of the Year
Larry Krystkowiak (Utah)
District VIII: All-District Team
Jordan Loveridge (Utah)
Jakob Pöltl (Utah)
Josh Scott (Colorado)

District VIII: Player of the Year
Dillon Brooks (Oregon)
District VIII: Coach of the Year
Dana Altman (Oregon)
District IX: All-District Team
Ryan Anderson (Arizona)
Andrew Andrews (Washington)
Dillon Brooks (Oregon)
Jaylen Brown (California)
Gary Payton II (Oregon State)
Ivan Rabb (California)

NABC
First Team
Second Team
Jakob Pöltl (Utah)

Sporting News
First Team
Jakob Pöltl (Utah)

Second Team

Third Team
Dillon Brooks (Oregon)

Conference awards
Voting was by conference coaches.

Individual awards

All-Pac-12

First team

Second team

All-Freshman Team

All-Defensive Team

NBA Draft

References